Harris Point is a rocky coastal point along the west side of the Ross Ice Shelf, Antarctica. Harris built a sick bay at South Pole Station during U.S. Navy Operation Deep Freeze 1961.

References

Headlands of the Ross Dependency
Shackleton Coast